Kamandoddi is a village in the Hosur taluk of Krishnagiri district, in Tamil Nadu, India. In addition to Tamil, Telugu is a major language in the village. It is expecting to be a Union by 2025.

References 

 

Villages in Krishnagiri district